Krykhitka Tsakhes is a Ukrainian rock band formed in 1999 in Kyiv, Ukraine. The band is considered to perform rock and trip hop music styles. In 2007 the band changed its name to Krykhitka.

Members 

 Oleksandra "Kasha Saltsova" Koltsova - vocal, lyrics (1999–present)
 Oleksandr Zlenko - drums (2007–present)
 Mykola Matkovsky - guitar (2007–present), bass (1999–2007)

Former members 

 Dmytro "Bass" Mrachkovsky - bass (1997-1999, 2007)
 Mykhailo "Mihon" Hichan - guitar (1999–2007)
 Yevhen "Jack" Matkovsky - drums (1999–2007)
 Yuriy Yurchenko - sax, clarinet (1999)

Albums

 2005 - Na pershomu mistsi (На першому місці) // COMP music/EMI.
 2009 - Rezept (Рецепт) // Fast Perfect

External links
Official website

Ukrainian rock music groups